Marwan Daou (born August 2, 2000), better known as Maro, is a Lebanese singer-songwriter and YouTuber from Beirut. He started his musical career posting cover videos on his YouTube channel in 2015, and gained a following in 2018. In 2019, Maro caught the attention of tech-music label SNAFU Records, which led to him signing a deal as an original pop artist. Maro's debut single "Carsick" was produced by Carl Falk and Albin Nedler, and released in August 2020, followed by "Take It Back", released in January 2021.

Early life 
Maro was born on August 2, 2000 in Beirut, Lebanon. His father had roots in Lebanon while his mother was from Ukraine. Due to the conflict surrounding Lebanon, they were forced to move many times during his early teenage years. Maro described creativity and writing songs as a coping mechanism to deal with the loneliness he experienced from moving around the country.  

Maro speaks 4 languages, French, Russian, Arabic, and English, and could additionally sing in Turkish, Italian and Spanish. In his teenage years, he was taught to play the piano by his grandmother, and in the second grade, and he taught himself to play the guitar through watching YouTube tutorials. He started uploading videos to his YouTube channel in 2015, playing the guitar and covering a variety of songs, in multiple languages and from different decades. 

After Maro's debut as an original pop artist, he cited his parents' music tastes as a major influence, which contributed to his sound by drawing inspiration from both Lebanese and Ukrainian culture.

Career 
Maro's follower amount grew substantially on YouTube in 2018 after uploading a cover of "Falling Down" by Lil Peep and XXXTentacion. Maro was noticed by Norwegian manager Eirik Schistad, and not long after, they started working together. In 2019, Maro caught the attention of the Stockholm and Los Angeles-based music-tech label, SNAFU Records. After a visit to the Stockholm studio, he signed a deal with the label as an original artist. 

Maro released his first original single "Carsick" in August 2020. The song was produced by Carl Falk and Albin Nedler. One of the most popular songs Maro had covered on his YouTube channel was Frank Sinatra's "Fly Me to the Moon", which was sampled in the outro of "Carsick". Maro has described "Carsick" as a song about love and the repetitive cycle of toxic back-and-forth relationships. Maro's second single, "Take It Back", was released in January 2021 along with a music video shot and produced in Oslo, Norway.

Discography

Singles

References

External links 
 
 
 Maro on Spotify

2000 births
Living people
English-language singers from Lebanon
Music YouTubers
Musicians from Beirut
21st-century Lebanese male singers
Cover artists
People from Beirut